Lung King Heen is a fine dining Cantonese restaurant in the Four Seasons Hotel Hong Kong. Its kitchen is run by chef de cuisine Chan Yan-tak, who came out of early retirement in 2002 for the Hotel.

The restaurant has earned many commendations since its opening. The Michelin Guide awarded it three Michelin stars in 2009.

History 
Chef Chan Yan-tak had spent part of his culinary career as a sous-chef — and after one year, executive chef — at Lai Ching Heen in the Regent Hong Kong (now the InterContinental Hong Kong) since 1984. However, after the death of his wife, he retired in 2000 to help take care of his children. However, Chan was persuaded by his colleague from the Regent, general manager Alan Tsui, to come out of retirement in 2002 to help the Four Seasons establish a Cantonese restaurant.

Reception 
Lung King Heen is critically acclaimed. It is the only Cantonese restaurant in Hong Kong that has been awarded the maximum 3 Michelin stars by the 2009 Hong Kong and Macau edition of the Michelin Guide.

In 2010, the restaurant's homemade XO sauce was listed as the 'Best condiment' on the Hong Kong Best Eats 2010 list compiled by CNN Travel. Lung King Heen was also added to Forbes Travel Guide's list of five-star restaurants in January 2014.

References

External links
 
 Lung King Heen at Forbes Travel Guide

Chinese restaurants in Hong Kong
Michelin Guide starred restaurants in Hong Kong
Fine dining
Cantonese restaurants